HMAS Wato (W127) was a tug boat operated by the Royal Australian Navy (RAN) during World War II. During World War I she was operated by the Royal Navy in the Mediterranean Sea. She later operated as a tug boat for the Adelaide Steam Tug Company before being requisitioned by the RAN. She was scrapped in 1955.

Operational history

Built by J. T. Eltringham & Company, South Shields in 1904 for the Adelaide Steam Tug Company and arrived in Australia in October 1904. Wato served with the Royal Navy in the Mediterranean during World War I.

After being requisitioned by the RAN on 11 May 1941, she was sent to Darwin, Northern Territory. As the war moved away from Australia, Wato operated around New Guinea until 1944 before being operated out of Sydney at the end of the war. The vessel earned a single battle honour, "Darwin 1942", for her wartime service.

She was returned to owners and was later scrapped in 1955.

References

External links
 
 

1904 ships
Ships built on the River Tyne
Tugboats of the Royal Australian Navy